The Election Commissioners of India are the members of Election Commission of India, a body constitutionally empowered to conduct free and fair elections in India to the national and state legislatures. The Election Commissioners are usually retired IAS or IRS officers.

[[Commissioner and the other Election Commissioners are Anup Chandra Pandey. and Arun Goel.

History 
Originally in 1950, the commission had only a Chief Election Commissioner. Two additional Commissioners were appointed to the commission for the first time on 16 October 1989 but they hardly settled down with their constitutional work, that the President on January 1, 1990, issued a notification abolishing the post of ECs. The government again made the Election Commission a 3-member body on October 1, 1993. The Election Commissioner Amendment Act, 1989 made the Commission a multi-member body. The concept of a 3-member Commission has been in operation since then, with the decisions being made by a majority vote. the official website was introduced on 28 February 1998.

Composition

Until October 1989, the commission was a single member body, but later two additional Election Commissioners were added through an act of parliament. Thus, the Election Commission currently consists of a Chief Election Commissioner and two other Election Commissioners. The decisions of the commission are taken by a majority vote.

Removal 
The Chief Election Commissioner cannot be removed from his post easily on account of any political reasons. This is necessary so as to preserve the independence of election commission. Chief Election Commissioner of India can be removed from his office by the president on the basis of a resolution passed to that effect by both the houses of parliament with a two-thirds majority in both the Lok Sabha and the Rajya Sabha on the grounds of proved misbehaviour or incapacity. Other Election Commissioners can be removed by the President of India on the recommendation of the Chief Election Commissioner. A Chief Election Commissioner has never been removed in India.

In 2009, just before the 2009 Lok Sabha elections, Chief Election Commissioner N. Gopalaswami sent a recommendation to the then President Pratibha Patil to remove Election Commissioner Navin Chawla, who was soon to take office as the Chief Election Commissioner and to subsequently supervise the Lok Sabha Election favouring his partisan behaviour in favour of one political party. The president opined that such a recommendation is not binding on the president, and hence rejected it. Subsequently, after Gopalswami's retirement the next month, Chawla became the Chief Election Commissioner and supervised the 2009 Lok Sabha Elections.

Compensation 
The Chief Election Commissioner and the two Election Commissioners who are usually retired IAS officers draw salaries and allowances at par with those of the Judges of the Supreme Court of India as per the Chief Election Commissioner and other Election Commissioners (Conditions of Service) Rules, 1992.

See also
 History of democracy in the Indian-subcontinent

References

External links

Election Commission of India